Unconquered Woman is a 1922 American silent drama film directed by Marcel Perez and starring Rubye De Remer, Walter Miller and Fred C. Jones.

Cast
 Rubye De Remer as Helen Chapelle
 Walter Miller as Bruce Devereux
 Fred C. Jones as Serge Ronoff
 Frankie Mann as Millicent
 Nick Thompson as Antonio

References

Bibliography
 Nash, Jay Robert. The Motion Picture Guide 1988 Annual. Cinebooks, 1997.

External links
 

1922 films
1922 drama films
1920s English-language films
American silent feature films
Silent American drama films
American black-and-white films
Films directed by Marcel Perez
1920s American films